Claudia Rayen Gallardo Llancaman (born 24 June 2000) is a Chilean taekwondo practitioner. She won the gold medal in the women's +67kg event at the 2022 Bolivarian Games in Valledupar, Colombia. She won one of the bronze medals in her event at the 2022 South American Games in Asunción, Paraguay.

In 2019, she competed in the women's lightweight event at the World Taekwondo Championships held in Manchester, United Kingdom. She also competed in the women's 67kg event at the 2019 Pan American Games held in Lima, Peru. In 2020, she competed at the Pan American Olympic Qualification Tournament in Heredia, Costa Rica hoping to qualify for the 2020 Summer Olympics in Tokyo, Japan.

She competed in the women's welterweight event at the 2022 World Taekwondo Championships held in Guadalajara, Mexico.

References

External links
 

Living people
2000 births
Place of birth missing (living people)
Chilean female taekwondo practitioners
Taekwondo practitioners at the 2019 Pan American Games
Pan American Games competitors for Chile
Competitors at the 2022 South American Games
South American Games bronze medalists for Chile
South American Games medalists in taekwondo
21st-century Chilean women